Chisholm Pond is a small lake located southwest of the hamlet of Treadwell in Delaware County, New York. Chisholm Pond drains west via an unnamed creek that flows into the East Branch Handsome Brook.

See also
 List of lakes in New York

References 

Lakes of New York (state)
Lakes of Delaware County, New York